"Girls on the Beach" is a song by the American rock band the Beach Boys from their 1964 album All Summer Long. Written by Brian Wilson and Mike Love, the song is in the vein of the band's previous surf ballads and features Four Freshmen-inspired harmonies. The song also served as the title track to the movie The Girls on the Beach.

Background and style
"Girls on the Beach" was written by Brian Wilson, whose 2016 memoir, I Am Brian Wilson, described it as "our last real surf-type song." It is a ballad in a similar vein to Wilson's 1963 song "Surfer Girl", but more musically complex and sexualized. Musicologist Philip Lambert notes the influence of the Four Freshmen on the song's vocal arrangement.

Biographer Peter Ames Carlin writes of an "erotic" quality in the song, reflected "both in the lyrics and in the voices themselves, which fall, climb, and tangle languidly through a series of augmented chords with a loving intimacy that communicates all the passion simmering beneath the words." Lambert says, Girls on the Beach' is less romantic and more lecherous, sung  the girls but  the other guys."

Recording
"Girls on the Beach" was recorded on April 10 and May 19, 1964 at United Western Recorders.

Release
In addition to appearing on the band's 1964 album, All Summer Long, the song featured as the title track to the surf movie The Girls on the Beach, filmed in April 1964 and featuring performances by the band. In the film, the band performed "The Girls on the Beach", "Little Honda", and "Lonely Sea".

Critical reception
Writing retrospectively for AllMusic, critic Richie Unterberger described the song as a "sumptuous ballad" and a "relatively little-known treasure," also noting that the song features "some of their best early harmonizing."

Dennis Wilson sang lead on the song's middle eight; brother Brian later commented, "Dennis does a nice job on the bridge". Biographer Jon Stebbins praised Dennis's line "the sun in her hair / the warmth of the air" as "[o]ne of the most perfect uses of [his] sexy voice", and the closing block harmonies as "one of the group's finest moments". In addition, he notes that the song "shows off Brian's incredible vocal-arranging skill, with complex group blends and multiple key changes".

References

Bibliography

 
 
 
 
 
 

1964 songs
The Beach Boys songs
Songs written by Brian Wilson
Song recordings produced by Brian Wilson